Bidarray is a commune of the Pyrénées-Atlantiques department in southwestern France. It is located in the former province of Lower Navarre. Bidarray-Pont-Noblia station has rail connections to Saint-Jean-Pied-de-Port, Cambo-les-Bains and Bayonne.

Located here is the Noblia bridge, a Roman bridge that spans the Nive. According to legend it was built by the Laminak or Sorginak (witches) in one night, earning it the nickname "the Bridge of Hell".

See also
Communes of the Pyrénées-Atlantiques department

References

Communes of Pyrénées-Atlantiques
Lower Navarre
Pyrénées-Atlantiques communes articles needing translation from French Wikipedia